CJAW-FM is a Canadian radio station broadcasting at 103.9 FM in Moose Jaw, Saskatchewan with a hot adult contemporary format branded as Mix 103. The station is owned by Golden West Broadcasting. CJAW's studios are located at 1704 Main Street North along with sister stations CILG-FM and CHAB.

The station received approval by the CRTC in 2006. The station signed on and broadcasting commenced on Tuesday April 22, 2008 at 10:39 a.m.

References

External links
Mix 103
 

JAW
JAW
JAW
Radio stations established in 2006
2006 establishments in Saskatchewan